Simon Templeman (born January 28, 1954) is an English actor. He is known for his video game roles as Kain in Legacy of Kain, Gabriel Roman in Uncharted: Drake's Fortune, Loghain in Dragon Age and Admiral Han'Gerrel vas Neema in Mass Effect. He played Larry Bird on The Neighbors.

Personal life 
He is married to actress Rosalind Chao, with whom he has two children.

Filmography

Voice acting

Film

Television

Video games

Live-action

Film

Television

References

External links

1954 births
Living people
Male actors from Los Angeles
Male actors from Sussex
English male film actors
English male stage actors
English male television actors
English male voice actors
English male video game actors
British expatriate male actors in the United States
20th-century English male actors
21st-century English male actors